The Kent Invicta Football League was a football league in England, formed in 2011 to commence operations for the 2011–12 season. It covered the traditional English county of Kent, some of which is now in Greater London. It merged with the Southern Counties East League in 2016, forming its lower division.

Formation
Negotiations to form a new Step 6 (level 10 in the overall English football league system) division began in 2009 to make promotion and relegation between the Kent League (Step 5, now Southern Counties East Football League) and Kent County League (Step 7) easier, as there had not been a relegation to the Kent County League for a number of seasons and promotions had been infrequent.

At the end of the 2015–16 season, the league merged with the Southern Counties East League and became the lower division of the merged league.

Challenge Trophy
The league also organised a knockout competition, the Challenge Trophy.

Final clubs
AC London
APM Contrast
Bearsted
Bridon Ropes
Crockenhill
Eltham Palace
FC Elmstead
Forest Hill Park
Glebe
Gravesham Borough
Kent Football United (formerly Erith & Dartford Town)
Lewisham Borough
Lydd Town
Meridian VP
Orpington
Phoenix Sports Reserves
Rusthall
Seven Acre & Sidcup
Sheppey United
Sutton Athletic

List of champions

References

External links
Official website
Unofficial League Page

 
Defunct football leagues in England
2011 establishments in England
2
Sports leagues established in 2011
2016 disestablishments in England